In liturgical use the term preface is applied to that portion of the Eucharistic Prayer that immediately precedes the Canon or central portion of the Eucharist (Mass or Divine Liturgy). The preface, which begins at the words, "It is very meet and just, right and salutary" (or a variation thereof) is ushered in, in all liturgies, with the Sursum Corda, "Lift up your hearts", and ends with the Sanctus, "Holy, Holy, Holy, etc."

In the Western liturgies, proper prefaces are appointed for particular occasions. In the various Eastern liturgies there is great variation. Among those who follow the Rite of Constantinople the audible portion of the preface does not change, but the silent prayer said by the priest will differ depending upon whether it is the Liturgy of St. John Chrysostom or the Liturgy of St. Basil the Great. Among the Oriental Orthodox Churches the preface will take different forms, depending upon the liturgical rite or the particular feast day.

Roman Catholic form
In the Roman Rite, the preface opens with the following:

Priest: Dominus vobiscum.
People: Et cum spiritu tuo.

Priest: Sursum corda.
People: Habemus ad Dominum.

Priest: Gratias agamus Domino Deo nostro.
People: Dignum et iustum est.

The current English translation has:

Priest: The Lord be with you.
People: And with your spirit.

Priest: Lift up your hearts.
People: We lift them up to the Lord.

Priest: Let us give thanks to the Lord, our God.
People: It is right and just.

Anglican forms
In the 1662 Book of Common Prayer, the preface omits the Dominus vobiscum ("The Lord be with you") and is in the form

Priest: Lift up your hearts.
People: We lift them up unto the Lord.

Priest: Let us give thanks unto our Lord God.
People: It is meet and right so to do.

Priest: It is very meet, right, and our bounden duty, that we should at all times, and in all places, give thanks unto thee, O Lord, Holy Father, Almighty, Everlasting God.

(A proper preface may follow for certain occasions) Then the preface before continuing onto the Sanctus ("Holy, holy, holy") ends with the following

Priest: Therefore with Angels and Archangels, and with all the company of heaven, we laud and magnify thy glorious Name; evermore praising thee, and saying:

In the 1979 United States edition of the Book of Common Prayer, this dialogue for Rite One, which uses traditional language, is given as

Priest: The Lord be with you.
People: And with thy spirit.

Priest: Lift up your hearts.
People: We lift them up unto the Lord.

Priest: Let us give thanks unto our Lord God.
People: It is meet and right so to do.

Priest: It is very meet, right, and our bounden duty, that we should . . .

Rite Two, in contemporary language, has the form:

Priest: The Lord be with you.
People: And also with you.

Priest: Lift up your hearts.
People: We lift them to the Lord.

Priest: Let us give thanks to the Lord, our God.
People: It is right to give him thanks and praise.

Priest: It is right, and a good and joyful thing, . . .

Lutheran forms
Among Lutheranism, the preface has many different translations that can be used in the Divine Service. The following is a common form:

Pastor: The Lord be with you.
People: And also with you.

Pastor: Lift up your hearts.
People: We lift them up to the Lord.

Pastor: Let us give thanks to the Lord our God.
People: It is right to give him thanks and praise.

The following form may also be used, however some responses may vary (noted with a "/"):
Pastor: The Lord be with you.
People: And with thy/your spirit.

Pastor: Lift up your hearts.
People: We lift them up unto/to the Lord.

Pastor: Let us give thanks to the Lord our God.
People: It is right and just/It is mete and right so to do.

Byzantine Rite form
In the Byzantine Rite, the preface opens with the following:

References

Eucharist
Latin religious words and phrases
Catholic liturgy
Christian liturgical texts
Eastern Christian liturgies
Anaphoras (liturgy)
Byzantine Rite